Simon J Pierce is a marine biologist and conservationist notable for discovering, studying, and protecting  marine animals, in particular whale sharks and manta rays, as co-founder and principal scientist of the Marine Megafauna Foundation.

Pierce has developed several non-invasive research techniques for endangered species, most notably developing photo-identification with computer image analysis and artificial intelligence to track populations of whale sharks and other species of marine animal. These techniques are now part of several Citizen Science projects, including Sharkbook, the global shark monitoring database, as well as other MMF projects such as Manta Matcher.

He led the current global conservation assessment on whale sharks for the IUCN Red List in 2016, then successfully upgraded the whale shark’s global protection through an Appendix I listing on the UN Convention on Migratory Species in 2017, and led the first IUCN Green Status conservation assessment on whale sharks in 2021.

Pierce is also a wildlife photographer.

References

External links 

Marine biologists
Marine conservation
Underwater photographers
New Zealand scientists
New Zealand biologists
University of Queensland alumni
Year of birth missing (living people)
Living people